Canoe River is the most northern tributary of the Columbia River in British Columbia, Canada. Its lower reach is flooded by Mica Dam. The lower Canoe River is called Canoe Reach, part of the Mica Dam's reservoir, Kinbasket Lake.

Course
The Canoe River begins in the Cariboo Mountains, west of Valemount, British Columbia, and flows east to the vicinity of Valemount, then southeast to join the Columbia River at the "Big Bend" of the Columbia, just upriver from Mica Dam. The reservoir created by Mica Dam, Kinbasket Lake, extends up the Canoe River nearly to Valemount. This impounded portion of the river is called the Canoe Reach of Kinbasket Lake. Although originally the mouth of the Canoe River was at the Big Bend of the Columbia, today it is said to be at the northern end of Canoe Reach.

The main tributaries of Canoe River and Canoe Reach include Camp Creek, Packsaddle Creek, Dave Henry Creek, Yellowjacket Creek, Bulldog Creek, Ptarmigan Creek, Hugh Allan Creek, Grouse Creek, Windfall Creek, Howard Creek, Foster Creek (flows into Foster Arm), Dawson Creek, and, right at Big Bend, Wood River (flows into Wood Arm).

Most of Canoe River, in the form of Canoe Reach, occupies the Rocky Mountain Trench, the same valley as the upper Fraser River and its tributary the McLennan River, which reaches to Valemount. The Canoe River and Camp Creek, one of its main tributaries, drain a region just north and east of the headwaters of the North Thompson River.

History
The Canoe River was named by David Thompson, who spent the winter at Boat Encampment near the river's mouth in 1811.
From the early 1820s until 1846 the Canoe River was a well-travelled section of the York Factory Express HBC overland trade route between London via Hudson Bay and the lucrative Columbia District fur region headquartered at Fort Vancouver on the north bank of thelower Columbia River.

The river was the site of a rail crash, near Valemount, British Columbia, in 1950.

See also
 List of rivers of British Columbia
 List of tributaries of the Columbia River

References

External links
 

Regional District of Fraser-Fort George
Rivers of British Columbia
Tributaries of the Columbia River
Robson Valley